Robert McGregor RSA (1847–1922) was a Scottish landscape painter, genre painter, portrait painter and marine painter. His genre was particularly painting working men such as fishermen, shepherds, crofters, pedlars, and farm labourers. However he also painted Scottish, French and Dutch country and coastal scenery. He usually signed his work in the right hand bottom corner.

Biography 

Robert McGregor (MacGregor) RSA was the son of a Scottish businessman who lived first in Bradford, Yorkshire, where Robert was born in 1847 but later moved with his family to Dunfermline and afterwards to Edinburgh when Robert was still young. Although he at the time had not had any art training he was employed at Nelson’s book publishers in Edinburgh as a book illustrator. He attended the RSA Life schools and simultaneously was taught by a French artist to paint and draw. He first exhibited at the Royal Scottish Academy in 1873 and was elected a member there in 1889. He continued to exhibit at the RSA until 1914.

McGregor travelled frequently to France in particular to Brittany and Normandy and to the Netherlands. In France he was influenced by the painters Jean-François Millet (1814–1875) and  Jules Bastien-Lepage(1848–1889). In the Netherlands he was influenced by the painters Anton Mauve (1838–1888) and Jozef Israëls (1824–1911), hence the changing styles of his work. James Lewis Caw (1864–1950), director of the Scottish National Gallery and the National Portrait Gallery, wrote of McGregor that he probably was the first Scottish genre painter to apply rigorous study of tone in his work and a pleasant if restricted colourist. Although he had learned much of some of his modern Dutchmen and his pictures were individual and have a sentiment of their own. Others praised him for the combination of tone with quiet colours and the more subtle light of the Dutch coast.

McGregor died in Edinburgh in 1922.

Exhibitions of his work
His work is exhibited at the National Gallery of Scotland, the public galleries of Glasgow, Dundee and Paisley and the Edinburgh City Collections

See also
List of Scots

References
The Dictionary of British Artists 1880–1940 compiled by J.Johnson and A. Greutzner, Antique Collectors Club, 1976, Baron Publishing, Woodbridge, Suffolk
Dictionary of Scottish Artist by Peter McEwan
The Directory of Victorian Painters by Christopher Wood, Antique Collector's Club, Woodbridge, Suffolk. England

External links
 Clerkenwell Fine Art
 The Atheneum 
 More information
 Robert Mc Gregor
 

1847 births
1922 deaths
19th-century Scottish painters
20th-century Scottish painters
Artists from Bradford
Artists from Edinburgh
British Impressionist painters
British marine artists
English portrait painters
Scottish landscape painters
Scottish male painters
Scottish portrait painters
19th-century Scottish male artists
20th-century Scottish male artists